Phragmogibbera is a genus of fungi in the family Venturiaceae.

References

External links
Phragmogibbera at Index Fungorum

Venturiaceae